The 1926–27 season was the 30th in the history of the Western Football League.

The Division One champions this season were again Bristol City Reserves. The winners of Division Two were Poole Reserves. There was no promotion or relegation between the two divisions.

Division One
The number of clubs in Division One was increased from ten to twelve:

Lovells Athletic, promoted from Division Two.
Poole, promoted as champions of Division Two.

Division Two
Division Two was reduced from thirteen to ten clubs after Poole and Lovells Athletic were promoted to Division One, and Bath City Reserves, Paulton Rovers and Swindon Victoria all left the league. Two new teams joined the league:

Lovells Athletic Reserves
Poole Reserves

References

1926-27
4
1926–27 in Welsh football